Michael A. Dvorak (born October 24, 1948) is an American lawyer and politician who formerly served as an Indiana State Representative and the St. Joseph County, Indiana prosecutor.

Early life
Dvorak was born October 24, 1948 in South Bend, Indiana.

Dvorak earned a Bachelor of Arts from Loyola University Chicago in 1970. He earned a Juris Doctor from Western State College of Law in 1975. He was admitted to the State Bar of California in 1975 and the Indiana State Bar Association in 1977.

Career
Dvorak served as a deputy prosecutor in Modesto, California from 1975 through 1977. He worked in private legal practice from 1977 through 2002. He also worked as a public defender in South Bend, Indiana from 1977 through 1986.

In 1984, Dvorak ran for the Democratic Party nomination for the 8th district seat in the Indiana House of Representatives, but lost a four-way primary election.

State representative
In 1986, Dvorak ran again for the 8th district seat in the Indiana House of Representatives, this time succeeding in securing the Democratic Nomination. Dvorak defeated three-term Republican incumbent Lloyd Taylor in the general election. His victory was considered an upset.

Dvorak left office in 2002, being succeeded by his son Ryan Dvorak.

St. Joseph County prosecutor
Dvorak successfully ran for St. Joseph County prosecutor in 2002, defeating Republican incumbent Chris Toth.

Dvorak was sworn-in in 2003.

On December 16, 2010, Dvorak announced that he would not to file any criminal charges against Prince Shembo, who had been accused of sexual assault by Lizzy Seeberg nine days prior to her suicide.

In 2015, Dvorak opted against seeking reelection. Democratic nominee Ken Cotter, a longtime staffer of Dvorak, was elected to succeed him.

Personal life
Dvorak is a Roman Catholic.

Dvorak and his wife Kathleen had eight children, Ryan, Todd, Sean, Brett, Carrie, Brady, Casey, and Tyler.

For decades, Dvorak has resided in Granger, Indiana.

In 1980, Dvorak began a decades-long involvement as a Michiana Soccer Association youth soccer coach.

Dvorak has served as president of the Quail Valley Homeowners Association.

References

Democratic Party members of the Indiana House of Representatives
American prosecutors
American Roman Catholics
People from Granger, Indiana
People from South Bend, Indiana
1948 births
Loyola University Chicago alumni
Western State University College of Law alumni
Indiana lawyers
Living people